Federal 3X is the twelfth mixtape by American rapper Moneybagg Yo. It was released on August 11, 2017, by Collective Music Group, Bread Gang Entertainment, N-Less Entertainment and Interscope Records, serving as his first commercial release with Interscope.

This mixtape serves as the third installment from his Federal series.

Commercial performance
Federal 3X debuted at number five on the US Billboard 200 chart, earning 30,000 album-equivalent units (with 14,000 in pure album sales) in its first week. This became Moneybagg Yo's first US top-ten album.

Track listing
Credits adapted from Tidal.

Charts

Weekly charts

Year-end charts

References

2017 mixtape albums
Albums produced by Tay Keith
Albums produced by TM88
Moneybagg Yo albums
Sequel albums